RPG Life Sciences (RPGLS) is an Indian pharmaceutical company. Formerly known as Searle (India) Ltd, RPG Life Sciences is part of RPG Enterprises. It has its corporate office in RPG House in Worli, Mumbai. Its three major activities are the manufacturing and marketing of bulk drugs, also known as API (active pharmaceutical ingredients); pharmaceutical formulation; and fermentation and biotechnology. RPGLS is present in the domestic as well as the international market. It exports its products primarily to Europe, Latin America, Australia and South East Asian countries.

See also
RPG Life Sciences Corporate website
Profile of RPG Life Sciences on RPG Enterprises Corporate website
RPG Life Sciences in media

References 

Manufacturing companies based in Mumbai
Pharmaceutical companies of India
Pharmaceutical companies established in 1993
RPG Group
1993 establishments in Maharashtra
Indian companies established in 1993